Le Montellier is a commune in the Ain department in eastern France.

Population

See also
Communes of the Ain department

References

External links

La Dombes and the city of Le Montellier

Communes of Ain
Ain communes articles needing translation from French Wikipedia